André Luiz da Silva Nascimento (born 4 March 1979) is a former Brazilian volleyball player who won a gold medal at the 2004 Summer Olympics and a silver medal at the 2008 Summer Olympics.

He was born in São João de Meriti.

Awards

Individuals
 2002 FIVB World Championship "Best Spiker"
 2005 FIVB World Grand Champions Cup "Most Valuable Player"
 2005 FIVB World Grand Champions Cup "Best Scorer"
 2006 World League "Best Server"

References

External links
 

1979 births
Living people
Brazilian men's volleyball players
Volleyball players at the 2004 Summer Olympics
Volleyball players at the 2008 Summer Olympics
Volleyball players at the 2003 Pan American Games
Volleyball players at the 2007 Pan American Games
Olympic volleyball players of Brazil
Olympic gold medalists for Brazil
Olympic silver medalists for Brazil
Olympic medalists in volleyball
Medalists at the 2008 Summer Olympics
Medalists at the 2004 Summer Olympics
People from São João de Meriti
Panathinaikos V.C. players
Pan American Games bronze medalists for Brazil
Pan American Games gold medalists for Brazil
Pan American Games medalists in volleyball
Medalists at the 2003 Pan American Games
Medalists at the 2007 Pan American Games
Sportspeople from Rio de Janeiro (state)